Maryland Route 137 (MD 137) is a state highway in the U.S. state of Maryland. Known as Mount Carmel Road, the state highway runs  from Gunpowder Road near Hampstead east to MD 45 at Hereford in northern Baltimore County. MD 137 was built in the early 1920s.

Route description

MD 137 begins at a three-way intersection with Gunpowder Road, which heads east toward Prettyboy Reservoir, and a county-maintained continuation of Mount Carmel Road west toward Hampstead. Mount Carmel Road becomes Lower Beckleysville Road on entering Carroll County and intersects MD 88 (Black Rock Road). MD 137 heads south as a two-lane undivided road and curves east and intersects MD 25 (Falls Road). The state highway continues east through farmland along the drainage divide between Gunpowder Falls to the north and its tributary Western Run to the south and passes its namesake church, now named Mount Carmel United Methodist Church. MD 137 meets Interstate 83 (I-83, Harrisburg Expressway) at a diamond interchange with ramps staggered into four intersections. A park and ride lot is located within the northwest quadrant of this interchange. Opposite the easternmost ramp, which is from northbound I-83 to MD 137, is unsigned MD 889, the access road to the Maryland State Highway Administration's Hereford Shop.

History
MD 137 was paved as a concrete road from its western terminus to Falls Road and from near the Mount Carmel church to York Road by 1921. The intervening segment between Falls Road and the church was completed in 1923. Outside of the construction of its interchange with I-83 between 1954 and 1956, MD 137 has changed very little since it was built.

Junction list

See also

References

External links

MDRoads: MD 137

137
Roads in Baltimore County, Maryland